Eagle Lake is a lake in St. Louis County, in the U.S. state of Minnesota.

Eagle Lake was named for the fact eagles nested there.

See also
List of lakes in Minnesota

References

Lakes of Minnesota
Lakes of St. Louis County, Minnesota